A Simple Story is a 1970 Tunisian drama film directed by Abdellatif Ben Ammar. It was entered into the 1970 Cannes Film Festival.

Cast
 Labiba Ben Ammar
 Juliet Berto
 Pia Colombo
 Amor Khalfa
 Jamila Ourabi
 Fouad Zaouch

References

External links

1970 films
1970 drama films
1970s French-language films
Tunisian drama films